Joe Spargur, popularly known as Joe London, is a professional record producer and songwriter. Joe has had recent success in the pop music world with the release of singles with Pitbull, Jason Derulo, Fifth Harmony and LunchMoney Lewis.

Discography

References

Living people
Record producers
Year of birth missing (living people)